Nikolay Stankov  (born 11 December 1984 in Varna) is a Bulgarian footballer who plays as a midfielder. He is 1.70 m tall and weighs 66 kg.

Career
Born in Varna Stankov started to play football in local club Cherno More. He made his debut on 11 September 2004 in a match against Pirin Blagoevgrad as a 73rd min substitute. Stankov played 8 matches in 2004-05 season.

In 2006 Stankov signed with PFC Nesebar. One year later he joined Kaliakra Kavarna. From summer 2007 to December 2009 he played for Minyor Pernik. With this team he was promoted to the Bulgarian first division during the 2007-08 season after a play-off against Kaliakra. On 29 September 2008 Stankov scored his first goal in A PFG against Spartak Varna. He scored goal in 85th minute. The result of the match was a 3:1 win for Minyor.

On 15 January 2009 Stankov signed with Beroe Stara Zagora.

Statistics
Last update: 15 July 2010

Honours

Club
 Beroe
Bulgarian Cup:
Winner: 2009-10

External links
 

Bulgarian footballers
Association football midfielders
First Professional Football League (Bulgaria) players
Second Professional Football League (Bulgaria) players
PFC Cherno More Varna players
PFC Nesebar players
PFC Kaliakra Kavarna players
PFC Minyor Pernik players
PFC Beroe Stara Zagora players
PFC Dobrudzha Dobrich players
PFC Lokomotiv Plovdiv players
1984 births
Living people